Gavleån, Gävleån  or Gävle River is a watercourse in the middle Gästrikland of Sweden from Storsjön to Gävle Bay (Gävlebukten) in the Bothnian Sea.

References

Rivers of Gävleborg County